HPCA may refer to:

 High Performance Computing Act of 1991, a U.S. act of Congress
 Himachal Pradesh Cricket Association, a sports body in India
 HPCA (gene), which encodes the protein hippocalcin